Vince is a given name and a surname. It may also refer to:

 Vince Bayou, a river in Texas
 Vince, Kumanovo, a village in Kumanovo Municipality, Republic of Macedonia 
 Hurricane Vince, a 2005 Atlantic Ocean hurricane
 VINCE. or Vince, a contemporary clothing brand
 Vince Lombardi Trophy: awarded to the winning team of the Super Bowl